Albert "Chalky" Wright (February 1, 1912 – August 12, 1957) was an American featherweight boxer who fought from 1928 to 1948 and held the world featherweight championship in 1941–1942. His career record was 171 wins (with 87 knockouts), 46 losses and 19 draws. In 2003, Wright ranked #95 on The Ring magazine's list of the 100 Greatest Punchers of All-Time.

Early years and family
Wright was born in Willcox, Arizona, though a few sources erroneously give Wright's place of birth as Durango, Colorado, or Durango, Mexico), the youngest of seven children born to James ("Jim") and Clara Wright (née Martin). Wright's maternal grandfather, Caleb Baines Martin, was a runaway slave from Natchez, Mississippi, who fled to the Arizona Territory shortly before the Civil War. After serving in the Union Army as a Buffalo Soldier, he homesteaded 160 acres in Graham County, Arizona. He bought cattle from Colonel Henry Hooker and established a dairy ranch on the property (which eventually grew to 640 acres), making him the first African American ranch owner in Southwest Arizona. He supplied dairy produce to Fort Grant and surrounding settlers.

Wright's father was born in Mexico and also raised cattle. Wright's mother worked as a housekeeper. Shortly after Wright's birth, his father left the family. Around 1918, Clara Wright moved her children to Colton, California. It was there that Wright developed a love for boxing.

Professional career
Wright began his professional boxing career at the age of 16, boxing for the San Bernardino Boxing Club.  The five-foot, 7½-inch Wright was unusually tall for his 126-pound weight, giving him a long reach. His first fight took place on February 23, 1928 against Nilo Balle, who he defeated in four rounds. Wright began fighting on the East Coast of the United States in 1938, losing a knockout to Henry Armstrong. Armstrong, however was impressed with his boxing style, and began using Wright as a sparring partner.  Impressed with his technique, Armstrong's manager Eddie Walker picked up Wright as a client.  He began winning again, and by 1938 was moving up rapidly in the ranks.

By 1941, he was among the world's top featherweight boxers. He beat Sal Bartolo on May 22 at Madison Square Garden to get a chance at the New York State Athletic Commission featherweight championship then held by Joey Archibald.  The modest crowd of 4,000 booed the decision for Wright, favoring the younger, whiter, and more regional Italian Bartolo from Boston.

Wright's pre-match regimen was described as "unorthodox" by the Baltimore Afro-American.  Before the Terranova fight Chalky was in and out of the Hotel Theresa bar for four days. He smoked evil smelling, twisted cigars. He drank freely of whatever his palate called for. He went where he wanted as late as 2 and 3 a.m., and then climbed into the ring at the Garden to put on a master exhibition of boxing and hitting power.

Taking the world featherweight title, September 1941
On September 11, 1941, Wright dethroned reigning New York State Athletic Commission's (NYSAC) world featherweight champion Joey Archibald with a TKO in the eleventh round in Washington, D.C., taking the featherweight title, as recognized by the NYSAC and Maryland. A left hook to the body and a right to the jaw ended the eleventh, 54 seconds after the bell.  Wright had kept his left jabbing and hooking to the face of his opponent and his rights to the body were equally punishing.  Archibald fought back well after the first few rounds, and showed excellent footwork, but was unable to hurt or slow Wright.

Wright successfully defended the title against former champion Harry Jeffra gaining a tenth-round technical knockout on June 19, 1942 in Baltimore.  The first six rounds remained somewhat close, but Jeffra was badly hurt in the seventh and eighth, as he lost his speed and fell victim to Wright.  Jeffra was floored for a count of nine in the ninth, and his defeat looked in inevitable, as Wright continued to bang away at him after he arose for the rest of the round.  As Wright continued to land blows against the nearly defenseless Jeffra in the opening of the tenth, the referee stopped the bout, coming between the contestants to end the match.

Before a crowd of 12,000, Wright successfully defended his title again on September 25, 1942 against LuLu Constantino in a fifteen-round split decision at Madison Square Garden.  The Associated Press gave Wright nine rounds, with five to Constantino, and one even.  Wright did most of his work from the fifth round on, and clearly had the edge in the eighth through fifteenth.

Losing the world featherweight title, November 1942
He lost his title in a fifteen-round unanimous decision before a crowd of 19,000, Willie Pep, eight years his junior, on November 20, 1942 at Madison Square Garden.  Pep, who made his fiftieth straight victory, used brilliant blocking and adroit shifting of his body along the ropes to defend the strong punching of his opponent.  Pep used well timed left jabs effectively at many points in the bout, which was not entirely one-sided.  The Associated Press gave Wright four rounds, including the fifth through seventh, but strongly favored Pep, who won decisively, with eleven.

Still fighting in 1946, he won only two of eleven remaining fights, bucking the odds and continuing to box as he turned an "ancient" thirty-four years of age.  He finally retired March 9, 1948, after losing to Ernie Hunick when he did not answer the bell for the fourth round.

Post boxing career
After his retirement, Wright worked as a trainer for lightweight contender Tommy Campbell. In January 1954, Jet magazine reported that Wright claimed he had written his autobiography, Me and You, under the pen name "Jay Caldwell". The book remains unreleased.

In October 1954, Wright opened a bar in Los Angeles called the "Knockout Lounge". He claimed that all of the bartenders were ex-boxers. By the mid-1950s, Wright had gambled away the fortune he had earned as a boxer. At the time of his death, he was working in a Los Angeles bakery.

Personal life
Wright was married twice and had one child. His first marriage, which ended in divorce, was to Gertrude "Gert" Arnold. His subsequent marriage to Jennie Batch in 1937 produced a son, Albert James. They were separated at the time of his death.

Confidential magazine scandal
In the 1930s, Wright became friendly with actress Mae West. West was a boxing fan and helped to finance Wright's boxing career. He eventually became her live-in bodyguard and chauffeur for a time. The two reportedly began a romantic relationship though both publicly denied this.

In November 1955, the popular tabloid Confidential wrote an exposé, titled "Mae West's Open Door Policy". The story, intended to raise scandal and arouse interest, described West's live-in love affair with the "bronze boxer" and how she frequently gave Wright hundreds of dollars to gamble. West denied the story and sued for libel and defamation. She won the suit and Confidential published a retraction. In August 1957, a highly publicized criminal libel case was brought against Confidential to expose the tactics used by the magazine's writers. Celebrity testimony was to include that of both West and Wright.  Though Wright died before he could testify, West testified a writer for Confidential had approached Wright falsely claiming he wanted information on West for a biographical film. West noted that Wright was paid $200 for the information, but insisted "...he didn't say any of the things they claim he did."

Early death from drowning
By 1957, Wright was in ill health, and had been hospitalized in July for a heart condition.  On August 12, 1957, Wright's mother found his body in the bathtub in her Los Angeles apartment. His head was submerged underwater and the tap was running. Rumors of foul play and suicide immediately began to surface as Wright was scheduled to testify in the high-profile libel suit against Confidential magazine. These rumors were furthered when Wright's first wife Gert Arnold, who was expected to testify, claimed she received an anonymous phone call from a "gruff voiced man" who told her "...if you know what's good for you, you'll clam up about this whole thing."

It was later determined that Wright, who had been hospitalized for a heart condition six weeks before his death, suffered a heart attack while in the bathtub causing him to slip and fall. He then struck his head on the tap, which rendered him unconscious, and he drowned. Investigators noted that Wright had attempted to stop himself from falling by grabbing a towel rack which was found pulled from the wall. His death was ruled accidental.

Wright's funeral was held on August 26. Baptist minister Henry Armstrong, a former sparring partner, and opponent, delivered the eulogy. He was buried in Lincoln Memorial Park in Carson, California.

Honors
Wright was inducted into the Ring Boxing Hall of Fame in 1976 and the International Boxing Hall of Fame in 1997.

In 2003, The Ring ranked Wright #95 on their 100 Greatest Punchers of All-Time list.

In 2012, Wright was inducted into the Colton, California Sports Hall of Fame.

Professional boxing record

See also
 Lineal championship

References

|-

External links
 

1912 births
1957 deaths
Accidental deaths in California
African-American boxers
Boxers from Arizona
Boxers from California
Burials in California
Deaths by drowning in California
Featherweight boxers
World featherweight boxing champions
International Boxing Hall of Fame inductees
People from Willcox, Arizona
Sportspeople from Los Angeles County, California
American male boxers
20th-century African-American sportspeople